Cruisin' was an American Rock-and-Roll and pop music sampler series covering the years 1955-1970 released by Increase Records, originally in 1970 on vinyl, 8-Track & Cassette (Years 1955 to 1963, with later years being released in 1986 (cassette), and in 1996 on CD and cassette tape again. The covers were stylized after the works of pop artist Roy Lichtenstein.

Each album of the series purported to be an authentic roughly 40-minutes recreating of a contemporary radio station from that year, complete with contemporary ads, station jingles, and a original radio DJ from that era introducing each song, reading out local news, and inviting the listeners to join in competitions.

External links 
CRUISIN': The ORIGINAL History of Rock and Roll Radio!, website dedicated to the series, including a lot of background material about its creation (Wayback Machine snapshot, dating October 16, 2013)
Increase Records on Discogs.com, including all entries in the Cruisin' series
Cruisin' 1958, review by Stephen Cook on Allmusic.com
Cruisin' 1958 Jack Carney WIL, St. Louis, review

Compilation album series
1980s compilation albums